Allan Fraser (born 19 October 1982) is a Scottish former professional footballer.

Career statistics

Club

Notes

References

External links
 Yau Yee Football League profile
 CelticWiki profile

Living people
1982 births
Footballers from Aberdeen
Scottish footballers
Association football defenders
Hong Kong First Division League players
Hong Kong Premier League players
Celtic F.C. players
Keith F.C. players
Newcastle Town F.C. players
Alsager Town F.C. players
Hong Kong FC players
Scottish expatriate footballers
Scottish expatriate sportspeople in Hong Kong
Expatriate footballers in Hong Kong